Babylon Health is a digital-first health service provider that combines an artificial intelligence powered platform with virtual clinical operations for patients. Patients are connected with health care professionals through their web and mobile application.

Their subscription business model for private healthcare services launched in the UK in 2013. They since expanded internationally to 17 countries including Rwanda and the United States. They also provide services in Cambodia, Hong Kong, India, Indonesia, Laos, Malaysia, the Philippines, Singapore, Taiwan, Thailand and Vietnam. The company covers over 20 million people and provides over 5,000 consultations per day.

History 
The company was founded in 2013 by Ali Parsa, who was previously the CEO of the Circle Health hospital operator and investment banker. Babylon Health, formerly Babylon Health Services Ltd, is owned by its holding company Babylon Holdings Limited along with Babylon's technology branch, Babylon Partners Limited. In 2014 Babylon Health Services Ltd. became the first service of its kind to be registered with the Care Quality Commission, the health care services regulator and inspector in England.

In January 2016, Babylon received the highest financing for a digital healthcare company in Europe with $25 million. Investors include Hoxton Ventures, Kinnevik and the founders of Google Deepmind. In August 2019, $550 million was brought in with a new financing round to further develop the skills of the artificial intelligence of the Babylon software. The equity items corresponds to an assessment of the company of over $2 billion. According to the company, around 4,000 medical consultations are offered per day in 2019.

Services
Babylon Health provides healthcare services through either their website or iOS and Android mobile applications. This is funded through a subscription based model, pay-as-you-go payments, centrally funded initiatives like NHS or as part of health insurance packages.

Users are able to send questions or photos to the company's team of health care professionals (which includes doctors, nurses, and therapists) in a manner similar to a text message. Alternatively, users can hold video messaging consultations with a clinician to answer questions for common medical topics such as fever, sore throat, allergies, skin irritations, and colds. This service also allows users to receive referrals to health specialists, have drug prescriptions mailed to the user or sent to a pharmacy or to consult with therapists to discuss topics such as depression and anxiety. In situations where a physical examination is required users can book health exams with a limited number of facilities in London, nurse appointments are limited to one location.

In addition to the direct healthcare services, users can access various health monitoring tools such as an activity tracker, ordering home blood-test kits and reviewing general lifestyle and fitness questions.

Operations

United States
Babylon began operations in North America in 2018. In August 2019, at the same time as their series C funding announcement, Babylon Health stated that the new investment would, amongst other uses, allow for international expansion into the United States.

In May 2020, Babylon Health announced a partnership with Mount Sinai Health Partners, which would make the app and its healthcare services available to New Yorkers during the COVID-19 pandemic. New Yorkers are able to consult doctors from the New York Telemedicine Association.

In October 2020, it was announced that Babylon Health and Home State Health had partnered to launch its new Babylon 360 service to health plan members living in 10 counties in Southeast Missouri which would see Babylon serve as the primary care physician via its mobile application. In March 2021, Babylon Health expanded its Babylon 360 services in California with investment in First Choice Medical Group which serves nearly 50,000 Medicare Advantage and Medi-Cal members. It also supports a network of 180 primary care providers and 1,000 specialty providers. In April 2021, Babylon Health acquired Meritage Medical Network, a medical group with 700 physicians based in California.

In January 2022, Babylon Health acquired Higi, a consumer health engagement firm, and DayToDay Health, a care management platform.

UK 
In the UK, Babylon Health provides services via private subscription, pay-as-you-go and through the private medical insurer Bupa. In November 2017, Babylon launched GP at Hand, providing a free at the point of care, NHS funded service.

GP at Hand patients can book virtual appointments through the Babylon App. If necessary, users can request in-person appointments at one of Babylon Health's clinics.  As a functioning clinic, GP at Hand clinicians can prescribe medication, issue sick notes, and refer users to specialists. As of August 2021, Babylon GP at Hand had a list size of over 100,000 patients. The patient population is significantly skewed towards younger patients, with 85% of GP at Hand patients being aged between 20 and 39  compared with just 28% nationally.  In August 2022 Babylon Health announced cuts to its NHS GP at Hand service in Birmingham as it was not profitable. Babylon also ended a ten-year partnership with the Royal Wolverhampton NHS Trust after only 2 years as it wasn't making enough revenue.

Rwanda 
In September 2016, Babylon Health launched in Rwanda as Babyl, in partnership with the Bill and Melinda Gates Foundation. Rwanda was the first country outside of the UK to acquire Babylon Health's services. By May 2018, Babyl was reported to have 2 million members, covering roughly 30% of Rwanda's adult population.

During 2018 Babylon launched their artificially intelligent chatbot in Rwanda. At the time of launch, the Babylon AI system did not include some common diseases relevant to Rwanda such as TB or Malaria.

In January 2020, Babylon Health reported 1 million completed consultations in Rwanda. In March 2020, the company signed a 10-year partnership with the Rwandan government, agreeing to roll out Babyl to all Rwandans over the age of 12 through the government's community-based health insurance scheme, Mutuelle de Santé.

Canada 
In September 2018, Babylon formed a partnership with the Canadian digital solutions company Telus Health to deliver Healthcare services in Canada. In 2021, Babylon stopped providing clinical healthcare services in Canada and have entered into a software licensing deal with Telus.

Funding  
In January 2016, Babylon raised a $25 million Series A round. This was considered the highest raised funding for a digital health venture in Europe. Its investors include the Hoxton Ventures and Kinnevik AB. In April 2017, it raised a further $60 million to develop its artificial intelligence capabilities.

Babylon's series C funding  in August 2019 was led by Saudi Arabia's Public Investment Fund. It raised $550 million. At the time it was rumored that the round was due to have a cap of $400M, making it oversubscribed. Notable investors include the ERGO Fund, Kinnevik AB, and VNV Global former known as Vostok New Ventures.

In April 2020, Kinnevik AB reduced their valuation of Babylon due to "greater uncertainty over the roll-out of existing partnership contracts as a result of COVID-19."

In September 2020, Kinnevik further reduced their valuation of Babylon by 10% while peer companies such as VillageMD and Livongo grew by 209% and 199% respectively.

In October 2021 Babylon listed on the NYSE (ticker BBLN) via a SPAC merger with Alkuri Global Acquisition Corp.

In May 2022 the share price dropped from around $1.50 to $1.  Parsa said "the UK government pays you to look after people in our [average] age cohort two to three times a year... in reality people use us six or seven times a year and we actually lose money on every member that comes in." The company had announced a near threefold increase in revenue for the first quarter of 2022, to $266 million.

Criticisms and controversy

Unsupported claims and chatbot safety 

There have been concerns raised regarding the governance of Babylon Health, in particular the use of misleading promotional claims and the safety and quality of the advice offered by its artificially intelligent chatbot. Critical safety concerns relating to the chatbot were raised with UK regulatory authorities.

In June 2018, the company announced that its AI had the ability to diagnose health issues as well as a human doctor, however these claims have been widely disputed and the methods of evaluation utilised by Babylon discredited. In November 2018, a Lancet publication concluded; "Babylon's study does not offer convincing evidence that its Babylon Diagnostic and Triage System can perform better than doctors in any realistic situation, and there is a possibility that it might perform significantly worse. If this study is the only evidence for the performance of the Babylon Diagnostic and Triage System, then it appears to be early in stage 2 of the STEAD framework (preclinical). Further clinical evaluation is necessary to ensure confidence in patient safety."

The safety concerns relating to the chatbot highlighted significant gaps within the medical device regulatory framework for eHealth Apps. Currently in the UK, AI Healthcare chatbots can be registered as a class 1 medical device (comparable to spectacles and walking frames), hence are not subject to any form of regulatory approval.

In February 2020, safety concerning relating to the Babylon AI Chatbot were the subject of a BBC Newsnight investigation. The UK's medical device regulatory body, MHRA, has acknowledged the 'concerns' regarding Babylon Health.

Investigation by Alberta's Privacy Commissioner 
In April 2020, Alberta's privacy commissioner launched two investigations into Babylon, by Telus Health, over non-compliance and medical privacy concerns. The reports found that the province's health information privacy laws when ignored when the Telus Babylon App was launched commenting; "I think what we have here is an example of an app that was developed in another jurisdiction and was dropped into Alberta without due regard for Alberta's legislation".

Sales of COVID-19 antibody tests
In May 2020, Babylon Health marketed a non-MHRA approved COVID-19 antibody home testing kit that used capillary blood (finger-prick). Abbott which developed the antibody test to work on venous samples released a statement to advice that the test should not be conducted with finger prick samples. The Medicines and Health Products Regulatory Agency (MHRA) asked all providers of COVID-19 antibody testing services using capillary blood collected by a finger-prick to stop providing these services and advised the public to ignore any result they get from the private kits.

Babylon App Data breach
On  9 June 2020, a data breach occurred in which three patients were provided with access to recordings of other patients video consultations. Babylon Health claimed the breach was live for 2 hours and was due to a software error. Following the breach, a Digital Health investigation found that a series of technical information exposing potential weaknesses in Babylon Health's technology was freely available through a Firebase database mistakenly left open. Babylon Health's app security score was 10/100, putting it in the "critical risk" category, according to the CVSS scoring, globally recognised standard for testing software and scoring its weaknesses. The full assessment report has been published on GitHub.

Legal dispute with Care Quality Commission
In 2017, Babylon made a legal challenge in the High Court to prevent the Care Quality Commission (CQC) from publishing a report that raised a number of concerns regarding the potential for prescriptions being misused and information not always being shared with the patient's primary GP. The High Court ruled against the injunction and the report was published on 8 December. Babylon has also agreed to pay the regulator £11,000 in costs.

References

External links
 Official website

2013 establishments in England
Medical technology companies of the United Kingdom
Companies based in the Royal Borough of Kensington and Chelsea
Health information technology companies
Private providers of NHS services
Companies listed on the New York Stock Exchange
Special-purpose acquisition companies